Theo Strang (born 21 May 1997, in Australia) is an Australian rugby union player who is currently unattached. His playing position is scrum-half. He was announced in the Rebels squad for round 1 in 2020.

Super Rugby statistics

Reference list

External links
Rugby.com.au profile
itsrugby.co.uk profile

1997 births
Australian rugby union players
Living people
Rugby union scrum-halves
Sydney Stars players
Saitama Wild Knights players
Expatriate rugby union players in Japan
Australian expatriate rugby union players
Melbourne Rising players
Melbourne Rebels players
Bristol Bears players